This is a list of spaceflights launched between January and June 1991. For launches between July and December, see 1991 in spaceflight (July–December). For an overview of the whole year, see 1991 in spaceflight.

Launches

|colspan=8|

January
|-

|colspan=8|

February
|-

|colspan=8|

March
|-

|colspan=8|

April
|-

|colspan=8|

May
|-

|colspan=8|

June
|-

|}

References

(January-march), 1991 in Spaceflight
Spaceflight by year